Charles Otto Lobeck (April 6, 1852 – January 30, 1920) was a Nebraska politician who served four terms as a United States representative.

Born in Andover, Illinois, he attended German Wallace College (Now Baldwin-Wallace College) in Berea, Ohio and the Dyhrenfurth Commercial College in Chicago, Illinois. He moved to Dayton, Iowa in 1869 finding a job as a clerk in a general store. He was a commercial traveler in Iowa and Nebraska from 1875 to 1892. In 1892 he engaged in the hardware business in Omaha, Nebraska and worked until 1895.

Also in 1892 he was elected as a Republican to the Nebraska state senate serving in 1893. From 1897 to 1903 he served in the Omaha city council, also selling real estate and insurance on the side. He switched parties to become a Democrat. He was a Presidential Elector for Nebraska in 1900. He served as city controller from 1903 until 1911.

He was elected as a Democrat to the Sixty-second United States Congress and to the three succeeding Congresses serving from March 4, 1911, to March 3, 1919. During his time in the house he became chairman of the U.S. House Committee on Expenditures in the Treasury Department during the Sixty-third through Sixty-fifth Congresses. He unsuccessfully ran for  reelection in 1918, returning to the real estate and insurance business. He died in Omaha and is buried in Prospect Hill Cemetery in Omaha. He was a member of the Methodist church.

References
 
 
 
 

1852 births
1920 deaths
Methodists from Nebraska
Burials at Prospect Hill Cemetery (North Omaha, Nebraska)
Baldwin Wallace University alumni
Democratic Party members of the United States House of Representatives from Nebraska
1900 United States presidential electors
Nebraska state senators
Omaha City Council members
Nebraska Republicans